Justice Archer may refer to:

 Dennis Archer (born 1942), associate justice of the Michigan Supreme Court
 Philip Edward Archer (1925–2002), chief justice of Ghana
 Stevenson Archer (1786–1848), chief justice of the Maryland Court of Appeals

See also
 Archer Allen Phlegar (1846–1912), Virginia Supreme Court justice
 Archer (surname)
 Archer (given name)
 Archer (disambiguation)
 Judge Archer (disambiguation)